Crash Craddock is an album by Billy "Crash" Craddock. It was released in 1986 by MCA/Dot Records. It was recorded in Muscle Shoals, Alabama and produced by Jimmy Johnson.

Track listing 
Honey Don't
I Didn't Hear The Thunder
Only Then
Love Burn
Broken Down in Tiny Pieces
She Belongs To Me
All Night Blue
Whatcha Gonna Do
Three Times A Lady
For The Good Times

Personnel
 Ava Aldridge - backing vocals
 Gary Baker - backing vocals
 Donny Carpenter - fiddle
 Cindy Greene - backing vocals
 Roger Hawkins - drums
 David Hood - bass guitar
 Clayton Ivey - piano
 Will McFarlane - guitar
 Steve Nathan - synthesizer
 Tom Rhoady - percussion
 Brent Rowan - guitar
 Cindy Walker - backing vocals
 Jerry Wallace - guitar

References

Billy "Crash" Craddock albums
1986 albums